The Proceedings of the Institution of Mechanical Engineers, Part E: Journal of Process Mechanical Engineering is a peer-reviewed scientific journal that covers research on the design and operation of process equipment. The journal was established in 1989 and is published by SAGE Publications on behalf of the Institution of Mechanical Engineers.

Abstracting and indexing 
The Journal of Process Mechanical Engineering is abstracted and indexed in Scopus and the Science Citation Index. According to the Journal Citation Reports, the journal has a 2021 impact factor of 1.606, ranking it 92nd out of 126 journals in the category "Engineering, Mechanical".

References

External links 
 

Engineering journals
English-language journals
Institution of Mechanical Engineers academic journals
Quarterly journals
Publications established in 1989
SAGE Publishing academic journals